Cuieșd may refer to:

 Cuieșd, a village in Brusturi Commune, Bihor County, Romania
 Cuieșd, a village in Pănet Commune, Mureș County, Romania
 Cuieșd (river), a tributary of the river Mureș in Transylvania, Romania